A  tall statue of Junípero Serra was installed in San Francisco's Golden Gate Park, in the U.S. state of California. It had first been erected in 1907 and sculpted by Douglas Tilden. The memorial was toppled on June 19, 2020, during the George Floyd protests, as a Juneteenth commemoration. The next day another memorial for Serra was torn down in Los Angeles at Father Serra Park by about five dozen indigenous activists. Other statues of Junípero Serra were involved as the protests expanded to include monuments of individuals associated with the controversy over the genocide of indigenous peoples in the Americas. Demonstrators also toppled or otherwise vandalized the statues of Francis Scott Key (author of the lyrics to The Star-Spangled Banner), Ulysses S. Grant, and a group consisting of Don Quixote and his companion, Sancho Panza kneeling to honor their creator, Cervantes.

Serra, as a major part of the California mission development by Spain in the 18th century, attempted to convert Native Californians to Catholicism. Serra's reputation and missionary work have been condemned by critics, who cite alleged mandatory conversions to Catholicism, followed by abuse of the Native American converts.

See also
 List of monuments and memorials removed during the George Floyd protests
 Statue of Junípero Serra (disambiguation)

References

External links
 

Golden Gate Park
San Francisco
Monuments and memorials in California
Monuments and memorials removed during the George Floyd protests
Sculptures of men in California
Statues in California
Vandalized works of art in California
Statues removed in 2020